The Police Act 1996 (c 16) is an Act of the Parliament of the United Kingdom which defined the current police areas in England and Wales, constituted police authorities for those areas, and set out the relationship between the Home Secretary and the English and Welsh territorial police forces. It replaced the Police and Magistrates' Courts Act 1994, which in turn had replaced the Police Act 1964.

Contents

Part I Organisation of Police Forces
Sections 1 to 35 concern the national and regional organisation of the police force, with slightly differently applicable rules inside and outside London.

Part II Central Supervision, Direction and Facilities
Sections 36 to 58 concern the functions of the Secretary of State in setting the police forces' objectives, handling budgets, and making more detailed regulations.

Part III Police Representative Institutions
Sections 59 to 64 concern the Police Federation of England and Wales and related rules. Section 64 contains the prohibition (in place since the Police Act 1919) on police becoming members of a trade union which can take strike action, under the Trade Union and Labour Relations (Consolidation) Act 1992. The Police Federation was thought to be a substitute, given the potential for civil unrest that might develop if police stopped working to go on strike. This was thought to make the police exceptional, and as an alternative, a system of arbitration to resolve workplace disputes was instituted. The constitution of the Police Federation is set out in the amended Police Federation Regulations 1969.

Part IV Complaints, disciplinary proceedings etc.
Sections 65 to 88 concern the rules of the Police Complaints Authority, handling complaints made against the police, and procedures for disciplinary hearings and dismissal of officers.

Part V Miscellaneous and General
Section 89(1) creates the offence of assaulting a constable in the execution of his duty. Subsequently, the Assaults on Emergency Workers (Offences) Act 2018 increased the maximum sentence on summary conviction to 12 months.

See also
UK labour law
Police Act

References

United Kingdom Acts of Parliament 1996
Law enforcement in the United Kingdom
Police legislation in the United Kingdom